In the client–server model, server-side refers to programs and operations that run on the server. This is in contrast to client-side programs and operations which run on the client.

General concepts
Typically, a server is a computer application, such as a web server, that runs on a remote server, reachable from a user's local computer, smartphone, or other device.  Operations may be performed server-side because they require access to information or functionality that is not available on the client, or because performing such operations on the client side would be slow, unreliable, or insecure.

Client and server programs may be commonly available ones such as free or commercial web servers and web browsers, communicating with each other using standardized protocols.  Or, programmers may write their own server, client, and communications protocol which can only be used with one another.

Server-side operations include both those that are carried out in response to client requests, and non-client-oriented operations such as maintenance tasks.

Computer security
In a computer security context, server-side vulnerabilities or attacks refer to those that occur on a server computer system, rather than on the client side, or in between the two.  For example, an attacker might exploit an SQL injection vulnerability in a web application in order to maliciously change or gain unauthorized access to data in the server's database.  Alternatively, an attacker might break into a server system using vulnerabilities in the underlying operating system and then be able to access database and other files in the same manner as authorized administrators of the server.

Examples
In the case of distributed computing projects such as SETI@home and the Great Internet Mersenne Prime Search, while the bulk of the operations occur on the client side, the servers are responsible for coordinating the clients, sending them data to analyze, receiving and storing results, providing reporting functionality to project administrators, etc.  In the case of an Internet-dependent user application like Google Earth, while querying and display of map data takes place on the client side, the server is responsible for permanent storage of map data, resolving user queries into map data to be returned to the client, etc.

In the context of the World Wide Web, commonly encountered server-side computer languages include:
 C# or Visual Basic in ASP.NET environments
 Java
 Perl
 PHP
 Python
 Ruby
 Node.js
 Swift

However, web applications and services can be implemented in almost any language, as long as they can return data to standards-based web browsers (possibly via intermediary programs) in formats which they can use.

See also
Client-side
Server-side scripting
Server Side Includes (SSI)

References

Servers (computing)